Contromelisia is a genus of mites in the family Acaridae. Nothing else can be said about them.

Species
 Contromelisia danielae (Haitlinger, 1989)
 Contromelisia vietnamensis Samsinak, 1969

References

Acaridae